The discography of Polina Gagarina, a Russian singer-songwriter, consists of three studio albums and 33 singles. She represented Russia at the 2015 Eurovision Song Contest in Vienna, Austria, with the song "A Million Voices", coming second in the final with 303 points.

Her debut album, Poprosi u oblakov, was released in 2007. It included her first single, "Kolybelnaya", alongside "Ya tvoya", "Morning" and "Ya tebya ne proschu nikogda". Her next album, O cebe, featured the singles "Lyubov pod soltsem", "Gde-to zhivyot lyubov", "Komu, zachem?" (alongside Irina Dubtsova) and "Propadi vsyo". Her third album, 9, released in 2016, involved "Day", "Tantsuy so mnoy" and "Stanu solntsem". Other high-profile singles include "Spektakl okonchen", "Nyet", "Navek" and "Shagay".

Albums

Singles

Music videos

References

Discographies of Russian artists